The Old Clarke County Courthouse is a historic county courthouse complex located at Berryville, Clarke County, Virginia.  The complex includes the Old Clarke County Courthouse, built in 1837; the original county clerk's building, dating from the 1880s; and a two-story building built about 1900 and containing the Sheriff's office and county jail. The former courthouse is a two-story, red brick temple-form structure, fronted by a full-height Tuscan order  portico in the Roman Revival style. The building served as the county's courthouse until 1977, when a new courthouse was erected. It was subsequently designated the General District Courts Building.

It was listed on the National Register of Historic Places in 1983.

References

County courthouses in Virginia
Courthouses on the National Register of Historic Places in Virginia
National Register of Historic Places in Clarke County, Virginia
Government buildings completed in 1837
Buildings and structures in Clarke County, Virginia